The Assemblies of God in Great Britain (AoG GB) is a Pentecostal Christian denomination in Great Britain. It is affiliated with the World Assemblies of God Fellowship. Its headquarters are in Manchester, England.

History
The Assemblies of God in Great Britain has its origins in the beginning of Pentecostalism in Great Britain in 1907. The British Assemblies of God were founded in Birmingham in 1924. In 1946, it had 403 churches. The standard hymnal of Assemblies of God has traditionally been the Redemption Hymnal. Although as time has moved on, the style of music within Assemblies of God Churches has become more varied. On 22 October 2005 the Irish Region was allowed to join with the Irish Assemblies of God, Republic of Ireland to form the Assemblies of God Ireland. Assemblies of God Great Britain has more than 500 churches.

Beliefs
The Assemblies of God Great Britain believes:
The Bible is the inspired Word of God, the infallible, all sufficient rule for faith and practice. It also believes in:
The Trinity;
The virgin birth, sinless life, miraculous ministry, substitutionary atoning death, bodily resurrection, triumphant ascension and abiding intercession of Jesus Christ and in his personal, visible, bodily return in power and glory as the blessed hope of all believers;
The fall of man, who was created pure and upright, but fell by voluntary transgression;
Salvation through faith in Christ, who, according to the Scriptures, died for the sins of humanity, was buried and was raised from the dead on the third day, and that through his blood grants redemption;
This experience is the new birth and is an instantaneous and complete operation of the Holy Spirit upon initial faith in Jesus Christ;
All who have truly repented and believed in Christ as Lord and Saviour are commanded to be baptised by immersion in water;
Baptism in the Holy Spirit as an enduement of the believer with power for service, the essential, biblical evidence of which is the speaking in tongues as the Holy Spirit gives utterance;
The ongoing operation of spiritual gifts and the fivefold ministry (the "gifts of Christ") in the Church;
Holiness of life and conduct in obedience to the command of God;
Deliverance from sickness by divine healing is provided for in the atonement;
The regular observance of the Lord's Supper for all who have truly repented and believe in Christ as Lord and Saviour;
Bodily resurrection of all men, the everlasting conscious bliss of all who truly believe in Jesus Christ and the everlasting conscious punishment of all whose names are not written in the Book of Life.

Structure
The Assemblies of God is divided into three geographical regions: England, Scotland and Wales. Each area is overseen by an area leader and together they form the National Leadership Team. In 2019, Glyn Barrett, leader of !Audacious Church in Manchester, became the national leader. On 26 September 2018 a new articles of association was adopted and a new board of directors elected composed of Darren Millar AM, Lukas Dewhirst, Keely Morley, Racheal Ita, Eliana Whyte, Paul Weaver and Mark Wiltshire.

References

External links

1924 establishments in the United Kingdom
Great Britain
Bassetlaw District
Christian denominations established in the 20th century
Organisations based in Nottinghamshire
Religious organizations established in 1924
Pentecostal denominations in the United Kingdom
Protestantism in the United Kingdom